The Jamaican giant galliwasp or sinking galliwasp (Celestus occiduus) is a species of lizard in the Diploglossidae. It was endemic to Jamaica. It was last recorded in mid-19th century, with locals reporting unconfirmed sightings. Its population has been ravaged and exterminated by introduced predators like mongooses. Recent surveys, while extensive, have not yet been exhaustive, given the difficulties of access into and around the Black River Morass, leaving room for some hope that the species may persist, albeit with a tiny population.

References

Celestus
Lizards of the Caribbean
Reptiles of Jamaica
Endemic fauna of Jamaica
Reptiles described in 1802
Taxa named by George Shaw
Taxonomy articles created by Polbot